Wahpeton Dakota Nation is a Dakota First Nation in Saskatchewan, Canada. Their reserves include:

 Wahpaton 94A
 Wahpaton 94B

References

First Nations in Saskatchewan
Santee Dakota